In Old Chicago is a 1938 American disaster musical drama film directed by Henry King.  The screenplay by Sonya Levien and Lamar Trotti was based on the Niven Busch story, "We the O'Learys".  The film is a fictionalized account about the Great Chicago Fire of 1871 and stars Alice Brady as Mrs. O'Leary, the owner of the cow which started the fire, and Tyrone Power and Don Ameche as her sons.  It also stars Alice Faye and Andy Devine. At the time of its release, it was one of the most expensive movies ever made.

Plot
The O'Leary family are traveling to Chicago to start a new life when Patrick O'Leary tries to race a steam train in his wagon. He is killed when his wagon hits a bump and his horses break loose, dragging him. His wife Molly and their three boys are left to survive on their own. In town she agrees to prove her skills as a laundress when a woman's dress is accidentally spattered with mud. She quickly proves herself and builds a laundry business in an area known as "the Patch". Her sons are educated. One, Jack, becomes a reforming lawyer, but another, Dion, is involved in gambling. While washing a sheet, Mrs. O'Leary discovers a drawing, apparently created by Gil Warren, a devious local businessman. Her sons realize that it reveals that he has a plan to run a tramline along a street that he and his cronies intend to buy up cheaply.

Dion becomes enamored with a feisty saloon-bar singer, Belle, who works for Warren. After a stormy courtship they become lovers. Meanwhile, Bob, the youngest O'Leary son, who helps his mother, is in love with Gretchen, an innocent German girl. They meet in the barn watched by the O'Leary's cow Daisy and plan to marry. Mrs. O'Leary approves of the match, but expresses disdain for the loose-living Belle.

Dion and Belle bribe the local politicians to set up a saloon on the street where the tramline will pass. Dion makes a deal to support Warren's political career and carve up business in the town. However, Dion's dishonest practices lead to conflict with his brother Jack when one of Dion's cronies is arrested for multiple voting. Dion later decides to support his brother rather than Warren in the election, convinced he can cut out Warren altogether and reign-in Jack's reformist zeal. He is increasingly attracted by the daughter of the corrupt local senator, leading to conflicts with Belle. Bob and Gretchen marry and have a baby.

At a Warren election rally a fight breaks out, arranged by Dion. All Warren's election workers are arrested. Jack is elected mayor. He soon announces a campaign against corruption, targeting his brother's fiefdom in the Patch, which he intends to demolish. Belle and Dion separate when Jack asks her to support him. When he realizes Belle might testify against him, Dion asks her to marry him, making her testimony inadmissible. As mayor, Jack marries the couple, but knocks Dion out in a fist fight as soon he realizes he has been deceived.

Mrs. O'Leary is told about the fight while helping Daisy's calf to suckle. In her distress, she leaves a lamp in the barn, and Daisy knocks it over. A fire breaks out. Soon the whole of the Patch is on fire. Dion, Warren and their cronies are convinced that Jack has set the fire. Warren's men look for Jack, seeking revenge. Advised by Philip Sheridan, Jack plans to create a firebreak by dynamiting buildings to stop the fire reaching the gasworks, but Warren's gang try to stop him. When Dion learns from Bob how the fire really started, he rushes to Jack's aid. In the struggle, Jack and Dion fight off the gang and set off the dynamite, but Jack is shot by one of Warren's thugs and then killed by a falling building. Warren attempts to flee but is trampled to death by stampeding cattle from the stockyards.

Dion and Bob help to save Gretchen and the baby, while Belle rescues Mrs O'Leary. They all manage to escape to the river. Belle and Dion are reconciled, and Mrs. O'Leary predicts that the city will be rebuilt and flourish after her son's sacrifice for its future.

Cast
 Tyrone Power as Dion O'Leary
 Alice Faye as Belle Fawcett
 Don Ameche as Jack O'Leary
 Alice Brady as Mrs. Molly O'Leary
 Phyllis Brooks as Ann Colby
 Andy Devine as Pickle Bixby
 Brian Donlevy as Gil Warren
 Tom Brown as Bob O'Leary
 Berton Churchill as Senator Colby
 Sidney Blackmer as General Phil Sheridan
 J. Anthony Hughes  (de) as  Patrick O'Leary
 Paul Hurst as 'Mitch' Mitchell
 June Storey as Gretchen O'Leary
 Gene Reynolds as Young Dion
 Eddie Collins as Drunk 
 Billy Watson as Young Jack
 Spencer Charters as Commissioner W.J. Beavers 
 Rondo Hatton as Rondo 
 Charles Lane as Booking Agent
 Francis Ford as Driver 
 Gustav von Seyffertitz as Dutch
 Russell Hicks as Politician
 Scotty Mattraw as Beef King
 Larry Steers as Belle's Admirer (uncredited) 
 Harry Tenbrook as Hub Patron (uncredited)

Production
During pre-production, MGM had announced that Jean Harlow, who was under contract to that studio, would be loaned to 20th Century Fox to star in the role Belle Fawcett. However, due to Harlow's untimely death, the part went to Alice Faye. Faye's popularity skyrocketed as a result of the picture, and she was reunited with Power and Ameche that same year for Alexander's Ragtime Band, which proved to be even more successful.

Some sources claim that MGM offered to loan both Harlow and Clark Gable to Fox for In Old Chicago if they reciprocated by loaning Shirley Temple to MGM for their upcoming production of The Wizard of Oz. However, this is merely a rumor, as Harlow died in June 1937, several months before MGM had even purchased the rights to Oz. The railroad scenes were filmed on the Sierra Railroad in Tuolumne County, California.

Awards
The film was nominated for the Academy Award for Best Picture. Alice Brady won the Oscar for Best Actress in a Supporting Role. She was the first person to win the Supporting Oscar after being nominated in the prior year. The film was also nominated in the categories of Music (Scoring), Sound Recording (E. H. Hansen), and Writing (Original Story), and won for Assistant Director (Robert D. Webb).

Historical accuracy
Despite crediting the Chicago Historical Society for assistance with historical research, much of the film is fictionalized. The area known as "the Patch" did exist as a predominantly Irish neighbourhood, and was associated with crime, as portrayed in the film. In the years before the film was made it had been supplanted by the Levee, an area renowned for its corrupt politicians, known as the Gray Wolves, whose deeds resemble those of the characters in the film.

The portrayal of the O'Leary family is largely fictitious down to the names of the characters. Mrs. O'Leary's name was Catherine, not Molly. The O'Learys had two children, one son and one daughter. In the movie there are three sons. Her only son was named James Patrick O'Leary. The daughter was named Anna. Their father Patrick O'Leary did not die in 1854 as a result of an accident involving his horses. He died in 1894. Mrs. O'Leary did not run her own "French Laundry" out of their house.

The Mayor of Chicago in 1871 was Roswell B. Mason, not an O'Leary son. However, Mason was elected on a reform ticket like the fictional Jack and took similar measures to deal with the fire. Mrs. O'Leary's son James Patrick did achieve success as a gambler and saloon owner comparable to that of Dion in the film.

Trivia
Scotty Mattraw and Eddie Collins both worked as voice actors is Walt Disney's first animated feature Snow White and the Seven Dwarfs the previous year, with Mattraw voicing Bashful and Collins voicing Dopey.

Home media
The film was released and restored to its full length on DVD in 2005.

See also
 List of firefighting films

References

External links
 
 
 
 
 

1938 films
1938 drama films
1930s disaster films
1930s historical drama films
20th Century Fox films
American black-and-white films
American disaster films
American historical drama films
Films about firefighting
Films directed by Henry King
Films featuring a Best Supporting Actress Academy Award-winning performance
Films produced by Darryl F. Zanuck
Films set in 1871
Films set in the 1860s
Films set in the 1870s
Films set in Chicago
Films shot in Chicago
Films with screenplays by Sonya Levien
Films with screenplays by Lamar Trotti
1930s English-language films
1930s American films